The 2013 Grand Prix de Oriente was a one-day women's cycle  race held in El Salvador on February 27, 2013. The tour has an UCI rating of 1.2. The race was won by  the Italian Noemi Cantele of Be Pink.

References

2013 in Salvadoran sport
2013 in women's road cycling
Grand Prix de Oriente